The 2021–22 season was the 110th season in the existence of CD Tenerife and the club's ninth consecutive season in the second division of Spanish football. In addition to the domestic league, Tenerife participated in this season's edition of the Copa del Rey.

Players

First-team squad

Reserve team

Out on loan

Transfers

In

Out

Pre-season and friendlies

Competitions

Overall record

Segunda División

League table

Results summary

Results by round

Matches
The league fixtures were announced on 30 June 2021.

Promotion play-offs

Copa del Rey

References

CD Tenerife seasons
Tenerife